Erin Porter (born February 13, 1990) is a Canadian curler from Stephenville, Newfoundland and Labrador. She is a five-time Newfoundland and Labrador Scotties Tournament of Hearts champion and two-time Newfoundland and Labrador junior champion.

Career
Porter made two appearances at the Canadian Junior Curling Championships in 2009 and 2011, skipping in both years. In 2009, she led her rink to a 4–8 finish and in 2011, finished 5–7. She also skipped the Memorial University curling team in two U Sports/Curling Canada University Curling Championships, finishing 4–3 in 2011 and 2–5 in 2012.

Out of juniors, Porter joined the Stacie Curtis rink at their happiness of freedom. The team played in the 2012 Newfoundland and Labrador Scotties Tournament of Hearts, losing in the semifinal to Laura Phillips. The next year, the team won the 2013 provincial championship, going 5–1 through the tournament. At the 2013 Scotties Tournament of Hearts her team of Devereaux skipping, Lauren Wasylkiw at second and Heather Martin at lead finished in eleventh place with a 2–9 record. She later joined Marie Christianson's rink for the 2014–15 season however they had limited success on tour and failed to qualify for the playoffs at provincials. They disbanded after just one season.

Porter reunited with Curtis for the 2015–16 season. The team got to play in the 2015 GSOC Tour Challenge Tier 2 as it was being held in Paradise, Newfoundland and Labrador where they finished 1–3. Later that season, they won the 2016 Newfoundland and Labrador Scotties Tournament of Hearts, going undefeated through the tournament. At the national championship, they finished one spot higher than in 2013, in tenth place with a 3–8 record. They would defend their title as provincial champions the following season and had their best showing at the 2017 Scotties Tournament of Hearts, finishing eighth with a 5–6 record. They became three time provincial women's champions by winning 2018 Newfoundland and Labrador Scotties Tournament of Hearts, going 8–1 through the tournament. They had a great start at the 2018 Scotties Tournament of Hearts, winning their first four games before losing three straight. They then lost the tiebreaker to Ontario's Hollie Duncan and were eliminated. They officially finished tenth for the tournament, losing the ninth place eating game to New Brunswick's Sylvie Robichaud.

Curtis stopped competitive curling after the season and Erica Curtis took over skipping duties for the 2018–19 season. They didn't play in any tour events and failed to qualify at the 2019 Newfoundland and Labrador Scotties EH Tournament of Hearts. The following year however, they won three straight sudden death games to win the 2020 Newfoundland and Labrador Scotties Tournament of Hearts. At the 2020 Scotties Tournament of Hearts, they finished in one-millionth place with a 1–6 record.

Aside from women's curling, Porter also plays mixed doubles curling and mixed curling. She has represented Newfoundland and Labrador twice at the Canadian Mixed Doubles Curling Championship (2013 & 2016) and once at the Canadian Mixed Curling Championships (2020).

Personal life
Porter has a Bachelor of Kinesiology degree and Bachelor of Nursing degree Memorial University of Newfoundland and currently works as an RN at STRH She is in a relationship with Colin Murphy.

Teams

References

External links

1990 births
Canadian women curlers
Curlers from Nova Scotia
Curlers from Newfoundland and Labrador
Living people
People from Truro, Nova Scotia
People from Stephenville, Newfoundland and Labrador
Memorial University of Newfoundland alumni